'The Man with My Face may refer to:

The Man with My Face (novel), 1948 American mystery by Samuel W. Taylor
The Man with My Face (film), 1951 American noir filmed in Puerto Rico